The Thrills Bite Size is an EP by Irish alternative rock band The Thrills, released exclusively through iTunes music stores in 2007.

The EP features three songs from the band's first album, So Much for the City, and two from their second album, Let's Bottle Bohemia.

Track listing

2007 EPs
The Thrills albums
Virgin Records EPs
Albums produced by Dave Sardy